Palatia may refer to:

Palatia or Palatias (died 302), a virgin martyr and Roman Catholic and Eastern Orthodox saint - see Palatias and Laurentia
Palatia was the late medieval name for Miletus
Palatia was the former name of the main settlement of Marmara Island
Nea Palatia, settlement founded by Greeks from Palatia after the 1923 population exchange
MS Palatia (1928), a German ocean liner
415 Palatia, an asteroid
Palatia jazz, a jazz festival in Germany
FC Palatia, a predecessor of 1. FC Kaiserslautern, a German association football club

See also
Corps Palatia Munich, a fencing fraternity